Digvijay Bhonsale (Hindi/Marathi:दिग्विजय भोंसले, pronounced as Dig-vijay Bho-slay, born 31 March 1989) is an Indian rock and metal vocalist, guitarist and songwriter.

He is best known as the front-man of Nicotine, the first metal band from Indore described as "pioneers of Metal music in Central India".

Bhonsale was born in Bombay and raised in Indore. He was educated at the Daly College. He completed his Bachelor of Business Administration from PIMR (Devi Ahilya University) and his Master of Business Administration from Cardiff Metropolitan University in Wales, United Kingdom. 

His great great grandfather moved from Barshi (Maharashtra), to Gwalior State and later settled in Dewas Junior State, where he and his descendants held a hereditary noble position called 'Mankari', in the state's durbar.

As well as performing with his band, he has also performed several times in Cardiff as a solo musician where he lived from 2010 to 2012.

In 2017 he moved to Harare, Zimbabwe and played several solo acoustic gigs at Jam Tree, Queen of Hearts, Amanzi and Corky's.

He collaborated with the members of the band Evicted, and played alongside Dividing The Element, Acid Tears, and Chikwata-263 at the 2018 Zimbabwean edition of the 'Metal United World Wide' concert at the Reps Theatre in Harare.

Bhonsale cites his influences as Nirvana, Incubus, Chevelle and Rage Against the Machine.

Equipment
 Jackson King V Electric Guitar
 Fender Jaguar Kurt Cobain Signature Electric Guitar
 Line 6 Pod X3 Live Multieffects Guitar Processor
 Dunlop DB01 Dimebag Darrell Signature Cry Baby Wah Pedal 
 Blackstar ID Core Amp
 Ibanez Dreadnaught Acoustic Guitar

See also
 Indian rock

References 

 

Living people
1989 births
Indian rock singers
Indian rock guitarists
Indian rock musicians
Indian guitarists
Indian singer-songwriters
Indian male singer-songwriters
Indian male singers
Indian male musicians
Musicians from Indore
Musicians from Madhya Pradesh
People from Indore
People from Dewas
Indian performance artists
Indian composers
Indian singers
English-language singers from India
English-language singers
The Daly College Alumni